Catoptria colchicellus is a moth in the family Crambidae. It was described by Julius Lederer in 1870, as Crambus colchicellus. It is found in Transcaucasia, Turkey, and Iran.

References

Crambini
Moths described in 1870
Moths of Asia
Taxa named by Julius Lederer